The 2017 NAIA Division II Men’s Basketball national championship was held in March at Keeter Gymnasium in Point Lookout, Missouri.  The 26th annual NAIA basketball tournament featured thirty-two teams playing in a single-elimination format.  The championship game was won by the Union Bulldogs of Barbourville, KY over the Cornerstone Golden Eagles of Grand Rapids, MI by a score of 72 to 69.

Tourney awards and honors

Individual awards
Most Valuable Player: Paul Stone, Union (KY)
Championship Hustle Award: Mike Martin, Union (KY)
NABC/NAIA Division II Coach of the Year: Kim Elders, Cornerstone (MI)
NAIA Division II National Coach of the Year: Kevin Burton, Union (KY)

2017 NAIA Division II Men’s Basketball Championship All-Tournament Team

Bracket

 * denotes game decided in overtime

See also
2017 NAIA Division I men's basketball tournament
2017 NCAA Division I men's basketball tournament
2017 NCAA Division II men's basketball tournament
2017 NCAA Division III men's basketball tournament
2017 NAIA Division II women's basketball tournament

References

NAIA Men's Basketball Championship
2017 in sports in Missouri
Tournament